Erekle I (Erekle Mukhranbatoni; 29 March 1560 – 1605) was a Georgian nobleman of the House of Mukhrani, a collateral branch of the royal Bagrationi dynasty, and Prince or co-Prince (batoni) of Mukhrani from 1580 to 1605. Erekle was married to a certain Tamar, with no known issue.

Erekle was a son of Archil, a grandson of King Constantine II of Georgia. Traditional genealogies such as that by Cyril Toumanoff omit Erekle's tenure as Prince of Mukhrani, instead placing a continuous rule of his cousin, Teimuraz I from 1580 to 1625. During Archil's captivity in Iran, Erekle lived with his cousins from the ruling Jaqeli family in the Principality of Samtskhe and fought on their side against the Shalikashvili-led aristocratic revolt in Samtskhe from 1576 to 1578. In May 1578, Erekle returned to the Kingdom of Kartli and provided support to Queen Nestan-Darejan, a consort of his exiled cousin, King Simon I of Kartli, who stayed at Surami. Soon, as the Ottoman army under Lala Kara Mustafa Pasha marched into the Georgian lands in August 1578, Erekle found himself in the heat of another war as an energetic and locally successful commander.

References 

1560 births
1605 deaths
House of Mukhrani
16th-century people from Georgia (country)
17th-century people from Georgia (country)